Bassel al-Assad International Airport  is an airport serving Latakia, the principal port city of Syria. The airport is named for Bassel al-Assad (1962–1994), son of former Syrian President Hafez al-Assad and brother of his successor Bashar al-Assad.

Facilities

Airlines and destinations

Military use 

Adjacent to the civilian airport buildings is the Russian Khmeimim airbase, the principal Russian airbase being used in the air campaign in Syria since 30 September 2015. The name of the air base Хмеймим has been also transliterated as Hemeimeem Air Base and Hmeymin Air Base. Among the Russian servicemen posted, there were as of early October 2015 around 600 members of the Russian Naval Infantry, whose role is to help provide security for the airbase.

Russian military activity at Latakia Airport had been disclosed by American intelligence officials by early September 2015. The same month, U.S. officials expressed concern about the Russian activities there. The Su-24 shot down by Turkish fighters on 24 November 2015 was said to be on its way back to Khmeimim.

The base, operative since 30 September 2015, can handle Antonov An-124 and Ilyushin Il-76 transport aircraft. It has parking locations for more than 50 military aircraft including Su-24s, Su-25s, and Su-34s. In addition, the base is home to T-90 tanks, BTR-82 vehicles, artillery and Mi-24 gunship helicopters and Mi-8 support choppers. Air-conditioned accommodations were erected within a few months in 2015. Other new structures include storage facilities, field kitchens, and refueling stations. Supplies are flown in from Russia or shipped via Tartus harbor 50 km away. On 26 November 2015, it was reported that S-400 missile system had been deployed by Russia.

References

External links

Airports in Syria
Buildings and structures in Latakia Governorate
2015 in the Syrian civil war
Russia–Syria relations